Donkorkrom is a town in south Ghana and is the capital of Kwahu Afram Plains North district, a district in the Eastern Region of Ghana.

Religion 
Its Cathedral of Saint Francis Xavier is the see of the Latin Catholic Apostolic Vicariate of Donkorkrom, which was founded in 2007 as an apostolic prefecture.

Education 
There are a few senior high schools in the District. Which are

 Donkorkrom Agric Senior High School, DASHS, is a secondary school in Donkorkrom. Hamilton Grammar School,
 St. Mary's Vocational/Technical School
 Amankwa Fisheries/Agricultural Institute

Transportation 
Donkorkrom has had its red road concreted, making travel to and from the ferry crossing easier.

Twin towns and cities 
List of sister cities of Donkorkrom, designated by Sister Cities International:

 Donkorkrom and Hamilton, Scotland are twinned.

References 

Populated places in the Eastern Region (Ghana)